These are the Billboard magazine R&B albums that have reached number-one in 1996.

Chart history

See also
1996 in music
R&B number-one hits of 1996 (USA)

1996